In mathematics, an algebroid function is a solution of an algebraic equation whose coefficients
are analytic functions. So y(z) is an algebroid function if it satisfies

where  are analytic. If this equation is irreducible then the function is d-valued,
and can be defined on a Riemann surface having d sheets.

Analytic functions
Equations